O. sulcata may refer to:
 Onoba sulcata,  a sea snail species
 Oocorys sulcata, a sea snail species

See also